Catching a Serial Killer: Bruce McArthur is a Canadian documentary film, directed by James Buddy Day and released in 2021.

Background 
The film examines the 2010–2017 Toronto serial homicides committed by Bruce McArthur; its premiere coincided with the release of Gloria Epstein's review of the Toronto Police Service's handling of the investigation.

The film premiered on Oxygen in the United States on April 11, 2021, as part of "Serial Killer Week", and had its Canadian premiere April 30 on Super Channel.

The film won the Canadian Screen Award for Best Documentary Program at the 10th Canadian Screen Awards in 2022.

References

External links
 

2021 films
2021 documentary films
2021 LGBT-related films
Canadian documentary television films
Canadian LGBT-related television films
Documentary films about gay men
Documentary films about serial killers
Canadian Screen Award-winning television shows
2020s Canadian films